Vernay is a commune (municipality) and former bishopric in the Rhône department in eastern France.

History 
There is no archaeological or written evidence of Roman or earlier occupation on the site.

Around 400 a Latin Catholic Diocese of Vernay was established. Neither incumbents nor other details are available.
It was suppressed, apparently without direct successor.

See also 
 Communes of the Rhône department
 List of Catholic dioceses in France

References

Sources and external links 
 GCatholic - former bishopric

Communes of Rhône (department)
Beaujolais (province)